Static Caravan Recordings is an independent record label based in the North West of England, whose artist releases include singles and albums by Darren Hayman, the Hornblower Brothers, Hannah Peel, Erland & the Carnival, Shady Bard, the Yellow Moon Band, Tunng, Peter Astor, Magnetophone, Fieldhead, Serafina Steer, Matters, The Memory Band, FortDax and Boat To Row. The label focuses mainly on alt-folk and indie music.

The label has a record shop, Static Records, located in Wigan town centre.

See also 
 List of record labels

External links
Official site

British independent record labels
Alternative rock record labels